The 2015–16 Dynamo Dresden season was the 66th season in the club's history and their second consecutive season in the 3. Liga.

Review

July/August
The opening match of the season took place on 25 July 2015. Dynamo Dresden defeated VfB Stuttgart II 4–1. Dresden got two goals from Justin Eilers and a goal each from Aias Aosman and Tim Väyrynen. Matthias Zimmermann scored for Stuttgart II. Dynamo Dresden finished the matchday in second place. Matchday two against Würzburger Kickers, on 1 August 2015, finished in a 1–1 draw. Michael Hefele scored for Dynamo Dresden and Amir Shapourzadeh scored for Würzburger Kickers. Dynamo Dresden finished the matchday in third place. Matchday three took place on 13 August 2015 against Rot-Weiß Erfurt. Dynamo Dresden won 3–1. Pascal Testroet, Aias Aosman, and Justin Eilers scored for Dynamo Dreden. Carsten Kammlott scored for Rot-Weiß Erfurt. Dynamo Dresden finished the matchday in first place.

September

October

November

December

February

March

April/May

Season

3. Liga table

Results summary

Fixtures and results

Player information

Transfers

In

Out

Statistics

References

Dynamo Dresden seasons
Dynamo Dresden